The Conqueror series is a series of novels by Conn Iggulden about Genghis Khan and his successors, set during the time of the Mongol conquest of the 12th and 13th centuries.

List of novels

The novels of the series so far:

Wolf of the Plains (2007) (titled Genghis: Birth of an Empire in North America, 2010)
Lords of the Bow (2008) (titled Genghis: Lords of the Bow in North America, 2010)
Bones of the Hills (2008) (titled Genghis: Bones of the Hills in North America, 2010)
Empire of Silver (2010) (titled Genghis: Empire of Silver in North America, 2010)
Conqueror (2011)

References